Youngcane is an extinct town in Union County, in the U.S. state of Georgia.

History
A post office called Young Cane was established in 1846, and remained in operation until 1955. The community was named for its location on Youngcane Creek.

References

Geography of Union County, Georgia
Ghost towns in Georgia (U.S. state)